Urban-type settlement is an official designation for a semi-urban settlement (previously called a "town"), used in several Eastern European countries. The term was historically used in Bulgaria, Poland, and the Soviet Union, and remains in use today in 10 of the post-Soviet states.

It was introduced later in Poland (1954) and Bulgaria (1964). All the urban-type settlements in Poland were transformed into other types of settlement (town or village) in 1972, while in Bulgaria and five of the post-Soviet republics (Armenia, Moldova, and the three Baltic states), they were changed in the early 1990s. Today, this term is still used in the other nine post-Soviet republics – Azerbaijan, Belarus, Kazakhstan, Kyrgyzstan, Russia, Tajikistan, Turkmenistan, Ukraine, Uzbekistan.

What counts as an urban-type settlement differs between time periods and countries and often between different divisions of a single country. However, the criteria generally focus on the presence of urban infrastructure or resort facilities for urban residents.

Soviet Union
In the Soviet Union the criteria of urban-type settlements were set independently by the Soviet republics. Those criteria, however, only differed very slightly from one republic to another.

Russian SFSR
In the Russian SFSR, urban-type settlements were subdivided into three types:
Work settlements: localities with factories, mining industry, power stations, construction industry, with population of at least 3,000 and with at least 85% of the population being workers, professionals, and the members of their families;
Resort settlements: localities focusing on resort and health facilities (around beaches, mineral water spas, etc.), with population of at least 2,000, with at least 50% of the average annual population being non-permanent residents;
Suburban settlements (dacha settlements): settlements with a focus on private summer-time and weekend recreation, with no more than 25% of the permanent population being employed in the agricultural sector.

Ukrainian SSR
In 1981, the Presidium of Soviet of the Ukrainian SSR defined an urban-type settlement as follows:
"To the category of an urban-type settlement may be included any settlement located near industrial enterprises, buildings, railroad connections, hydro-technical constructions, and enterprises in production and refining of agrarian products as well as settlements that include higher or middle occupation educational establishments, science-researching institutions, sanatoria, and other stationary treatment and recreation establishments that have a state housing provided to no less than 2,000 inhabitants out of which no less than two-thirds consist of workers, servicemen, and their families.

In exceptional cases, settlements could be classified to the category of urban-type settlements if they had a population less than 2,000, but more than 500; this happened when they had a close perspective of an economic and social development or a potential increase in number of people.

The term was introduced in Ukraine in 1920s and became official since the resolution of the Central Executive Committee of Ukraine of October 28, 1925 replacing all towns (mistechko) as urban-type settlement.

Post-Soviet states

Belarus

According to a 1998 law of Belarus, there are three categories of urban-type settlement in the country:
Urban settlements: with population over 2,000, industrial enterprises and developed residential infrastructure
Resort settlements: with population of at least 2,000, sanatoriums, resorts or other health recuperation establishments, and developed residential infrastructure
Worker settlements: with population at least 500, servicing industrial enterprises, construction sites, railroad stations, electric stations, or other industrial objects.

Georgia

Kyrgyzstan
In accordance with the 2008 Law on Administrative and Territorial Subdivision of Kyrgyzstan, urban-type settlements are those that comprise economically significant facilities such as industrial plants, railway stations, construction sites, etc., as well as settlements with a recreational potential with population of at least 2,000. In exceptional cases, administrative, economic and cultural centers with a potential of economical development and population growth can be classified as urban-type settlements.

Russia

Inhabited localities
In modern Russia, the task of deciding whether an inhabited locality meets the criteria of urban-type settlements is delegated to the federal subjects. In most cases, the federal subject's legislative body is responsible for all administrative and territorial changes, including granting and revoking of the urban-type settlement and town status.

Administrative divisions
Apart from being used to refer to a type of inhabited locality, the term "urban-type settlement" and its variations is also used to refer to a division of an administrative district, and sometimes to a division administratively subordinated to a city district of a city of federal subject significance. This kind of administrative division is equal in status to the towns of district significance and selsoviets, and is normally centered on an inhabited locality with urban-type settlement status. As of 2013, the following types of such entities are recognized:
Resort settlement: in Nizhny Novgorod Oblast
Settlement: in the Republic of Dagestan and the Sakha Republic; in Krasnoyarsk and Stavropol Krais
Settlement administration: in Altai Krai
Settlement administrative okrug: in Bryansk Oblast
Settlement council: in the Republic of Bashkortostan and the Udmurt Republic; in Altai Krai; in Tambov Oblast
Settlement municipal formation: in Leningrad Oblast
Settlement okrug: in Krasnodar Krai; in Belgorod and Ulyanovsk Oblasts
Suburban settlement: in Moscow and Omsk Oblasts
Urban settlement: in the Chuvash Republic; in Amur, Rostov, Smolensk, Tver, and Voronezh Oblasts
Urban settlement (urban-type settlement): in Kostroma Oblast
Urban-type settlement: in the Republic of Buryatia, the Chechen Republic, the Mari El Republic, and the Republic of Tatarstan; in Astrakhan, Kemerovo, Kirov, Murmansk, Nizhny Novgorod, Oryol, Sakhalin, Tula, Volgograd, and Vologda Oblasts
Urban-type settlement administrative territory: in the Komi Republic
Urban-type settlement of district significance: in Kaliningrad Oblast and Nenets Autonomous Okrug
Urban-type settlement (settlement council): in the Republic of Khakassia
Urban-type settlement under district jurisdiction: in Kurgan Oblast
Urban-type settlement (urban settlement): in the Tuva Republic
Urban-type settlement with jurisdictional territory: in Arkhangelsk Oblast
Work settlement: in the Republic of Mordovia; in Krasnoyarsk Krai; in Belgorod, Chelyabinsk, Kursk, Moscow, Nizhny Novgorod, Novosibirsk, Omsk, Penza, Ryazan, and Yaroslavl Oblasts

Ukraine

See also
 Administrative divisions of Georgia (country)
 Administrative divisions of Ukraine
 Political divisions of Russia
 Regions of Belarus
 Subdivisions of Kyrgyzstan

Notes

References

Types of towns
 
Administrative divisions of Russia
People's Republic of Bulgaria
Polish People's Republic
Urban geography
Soviet phraseology